Golondaaj is a 2021 Indian Bengali-language historical sports drama film directed by Dhrubo Banerjee and produced by Shrikant Mohta and Mahendra Soni under the banner of SVF. The film stars Dev, Alexx O'Nell, Anirban Bhattacharya,  Ishaa Saha, Indrasish Roy, John Bhattacharya, Mirchi  Agni and Srikanta Acharya. It is based on the life of Nagendra Prasad Sarbadhikari, "Father of Indian football". The film was a blockbuster at box-office. Despite Tonic was a blockbuster at box-office but at the end it's runtime Golondaaj was a clean 'theatrical' blockbuster.

Synopsis 
Based on true events, Golondaaj depicts the inspiring journey of Nagendra Prasad Sarbadhikari, "The Father of Indian Football" who was the first Indian to play the sport and open a professional football club in the country.

Cast

Production
The list of actors and actresses of the film was released on 25 January 2020 from the Twitter handle of SVF. That list shows that Dev, Anirban Bhattacharya, Ishaa Saha, Indrasish Roy, Srikanta Acharya, John Bhattacharya are acting in the film. A The Times Of India article dated 2 April 2020 subsequently revealed Alexx O'Nell stars as Major Frederick Jackson, antagonist of the film.

It is the third flim of director Druvo Banarjee and first time collaboration with Dev.

The shooting for the film began in Kolkata from 5 February 2020. Due to COVID-19 Pandemic they had to pause the shooting. The shooting was resumed on 1 December 2020 and wrapped up on 24 February 2021.

Soundtrack

The background score and the soundtracks are composed by Bickram Ghosh and lyrics are penned by Srijato and Sugato Guha.

Release
The film released theatrically on 10 October 2021 and Golondaaj (2021) Hindi Dubbed Version also released theatrically on 12 November 2021 as Officially by SVF and it is soon to arrive as World Digital Premiere in our mobile phones, laptops and TVs in SVF's official OTT platform, hoichoi and internationally on Amazon Prime Video and later as World Television Premiere in Star Jalsha.

Reception 
The film got positive to mixed reviews from critics who praised the direction, acting performances and music but found the screenplay flawed.

References

External links
 

2021 films
Bengali-language Indian films
Indian sports drama films
2020s Bengali-language films
Films postponed due to the COVID-19 pandemic
Film productions suspended due to the COVID-19 pandemic
Indian biographical drama films
Films scored by Bickram Ghosh
Indian association football films
2021 biographical drama films